In mathematics, Dirichlet's test is a method of testing for the convergence of a series. It is named after its author Peter Gustav Lejeune Dirichlet, and was published posthumously in the Journal de Mathématiques Pures et Appliquées in 1862.

Statement 

The test states that if  is a sequence of real numbers and  a sequence of complex numbers satisfying
  is monotonic
 
  for every positive integer N
where M is some constant, then the series

converges.

Proof 

From summation by parts, we have that .

We have, for each k, . But, if  is decreasing,

Thus,  converges. And, if  is increasing,

Thus, again,  converges.

So, the series  converges, by the absolute convergence test. Hence  converges.

Applications 

A particular case of Dirichlet's test is the more commonly used alternating series test for the case

Another corollary is that  converges whenever  is a decreasing sequence that tends to zero.

Improper integrals 

An analogous statement for convergence of improper integrals is proven using integration by parts. If the integral of a function f is uniformly bounded over all intervals, and g is a non-negative monotonically decreasing function, then the integral of fg is a convergent improper integral.

Notes

References 

 Hardy, G. H., A Course of Pure Mathematics, Ninth edition, Cambridge University Press, 1946. (pp. 379–380).
 Voxman, William L., Advanced Calculus: An Introduction to Modern Analysis, Marcel Dekker, Inc., New York, 1981. (§8.B.13–15) .

External links 
 PlanetMath.org

Convergence tests